William Russell Kelly (November 21, 1905 – January 3, 1998) was the founder of the American temporary staffing agency, Russell Kelly Office Service, later known as Kelly Girl Service, Inc., then Kelly Services, Inc.

Early life
Born in Koksilah, British Columbia, he was the fifth of seven children born to Mary Agnes Bickel Kelly and James Watson Kelly.  One obituary states "Upon graduation from Gulfcoast Military Academy in Gulfport, Miss. in 1922, Kelly, then 16, began attending Vanderbilt University and then the University of Pittsburgh.". Yet another states he was an undergraduate at the University of Pennsylvania.

References

External links 
 www.kellyservices.com — William Russell Kelly Tribute
 

American business executives
1905 births
1998 deaths
University of Pennsylvania alumni
People from the Cowichan Valley Regional District
Vanderbilt University alumni
University of Pittsburgh alumni
American company founders
Canadian emigrants to the United States